Akwapim South is one of the constituencies represented in the Parliament of Ghana. It elects one Member of Parliament (MP) by the first past the post system of election. Akwapim South used to be known as the Aburi-Nsawam constituency until it was divided in 2012 which gave us Akwapim South and Nsawam Adoagyiri constituencies.

Boundaries
The seat is located entirely within the Akuapem South Municipal Assembly of the Eastern Region of Ghana.

Members of Parliament

See also
List of Ghana Parliament constituencies
Akuapim South Municipal District

References

Parliamentary constituencies in the Eastern Region (Ghana)